Doctor on the Job is a 1976 comedy novel by the British writer Richard Gordon (English author). Part of the long-running Doctor series, it portrays a major strike at St Swithan's Hospital to the fury of Sir Lancelot Spratt.

References

Bibliography
 Pringle, David. Imaginary People: A Who's who of Fictional Characters from the Eighteenth Century to the Present Day. Scolar Press, 1996.

1976 British novels
Novels by Richard Gordon
Comedy novels
Novels set in hospitals
Heinemann (publisher) books